Kazi may refer to:

 Kazi (given name),
 Kaji (Nepal), Nepalese prime ministerial position (later reduced to ministers)
 Qadi or Kazi or Qazi, an Islamic legal scholar and judge
 KAZI-FM, an FM radio station in Austin, Texas
 Kazi (comics), a fictional character in the Marvel Comics
 Kazi (Marvel Cinematic Universe), the Marvel Cinematic Universe counterpart of the character
 Kazi, an honorific title used historically in the north Indian Kingdom of Sikkim
 Kazi, a mythical female healer of 8th century Czech mythology, the sister of Libuše
 "Kazi", nickname of Chris Rolle, hip hop musician
 Kazy is also a Kyrgyz dish and Kazakh dish
 Kazi Township, Lhünzhub County (卡孜乡), Tibet Autonomous Region, People's Republic of China
 Kazi Township, Namling County (卡孜乡), a township in Namling County in Tibet Autonomous Region
 The Japanese surname Kaji (surname), as written in Kunrei-shiki or Nihon-shiki

See also 
 Kaji (disambiguation)
 Kasi (disambiguation)
 Gazi (disambiguation)
 Qazi (disambiguation)